Valentyna Evert (born 8 March 1946) is a Ukrainian athlete. She competed in the women's javelin throw at the 1968 Summer Olympics, representing the Soviet Union.

References

1946 births
Living people
Athletes (track and field) at the 1968 Summer Olympics
Ukrainian female javelin throwers
Olympic athletes of the Soviet Union
Sportspeople from Kharkiv
Universiade bronze medalists for the Soviet Union
Universiade medalists in athletics (track and field)
Soviet female javelin throwers